My Favorite Things may refer to:

"My Favorite Things" (song), from the 1959 musical The Sound of Music
My Favorite Things (John Coltrane album), 1961
My Favorite Things (Dave Brubeck album), 1965
My Favorite Things (Shiori Takei album), 2004
My Favorite Things (Joey Alexander album), 2015
My Favorite Things: Coltrane at Newport, a 2007 album
"My Favorite Things" (Barney & Friends), a television episode

See also
"Favourite Things", a 2003 single by Big Brovaz